is a passenger railway station located in the town of Kotohira, Nakatado District, Kagawa Prefecture, Japan. It is operated by JR Shikoku and has the station number "D15".

Lines
All regular trains including limited express trains stop here.

Layout
The station consists of two island platforms and four tracks. The station is staffed. This station is the southern end of the ICOCA area of JR Shikoku, and transportation IC cards cannot be used beyond this point. This station is also the end of the electrified section of the Dosan Line.

Adjacent stations

|-
!colspan=5|JR Shikoku

History
Kotohira Station opened on 23 May 1889 as a station on the Sanuki Railway. The Sanuki Railway was acquired by Sanyo Railway in 1904, and was nationalized in 1906. In November 1922, the station was relocated to its present site, with the former station becoming Kotohira Station of the Kotohira Sangu Electric Railway (later Kotosan Kotohira Station, now Hira Onsen Kotosankaku, also known as a hot spring inn). The current station building was completed in 1936. At that time the station was operated by Japanese Government Railways, later becoming Japanese National Railways (JNR). With the privatization of JNR on 1 April 1987, control of the station passed to JR Shikoku.

Surrounding area
 Kotohira-gū
Konpira Grand Theatre
Kotoden-Kotohira Station

See also
 List of railway stations in Japan

References

External links

 

Railway stations in Kagawa Prefecture
Railway stations in Japan opened in 1889